Ride the Hot Wind is a 1971 film. It was made by Ted Kelly who was a good friend of Audie Murphy.

In 1975, Kirk, Kelly, and several others of those involved in Ride The Hot Wind made My Name Is Legend.

Plot
Captain Gregory Shank is a Vietnam veteran who has been imprisoned by the U.S. Army for being responsible for a massacre during the war. After he's released he tries to star fresh but employers fire him after they find out his past, he gets in brawls and he struggles to maintain a relationship. He falls in with some bikers. They go on a crime spree and the police assume Gregory is the ringleader.

Cast
Tommy Kirk as Gregory Shank
Duke Kelly
Cheryl Waters
Sherry Bain
Richard Ford Grayling
Jared Snyder

Production
Tommy Kirk starred and later recalled about the movie:
This was his [Kelly's] attempt to do a sympathetic dramatisation of a Lieutenant Calley-type character (Mỹ Lai massacre) coming home and portraying his bitterness, alienation and unhappiness at being fingered as a murderer, a baby killer and a monster. That's who I played. I'm not completely embarrassed by the film, but after I saw it, I wished they would have cut some things. Some of it was pretty stinko. Other things weren't so bad. The movie as a whole was a failure, but it wasn't trash.

See also
 List of American films of 1971

References

External links
Ride the Hot Wind at Letterbox DVD

Ride the Hot Wind at BFI

1971 films
1971 action films
American action films
1970s American films